William Woodhouse (December 11, 1936 – January 9, 2014) was an American sprinter.

References

1936 births
2014 deaths
American male sprinters
Athletes (track and field) at the 1959 Pan American Games
Pan American Games medalists in athletics (track and field)
Pan American Games gold medalists for the United States
Medalists at the 1959 Pan American Games